Born to Be Wild is the second album released by Juice Crew member and East Coast rapper MC Shan. With the production work of Marley Marl, MC Shan directly attacked Boogie Down Productions with "Juice Crew Law" and ended the silence around their feud.

Track listing 
All tracks produced by Marley Marl

 "I Pioneered This"
 "Give Me My Freedom"
 "So Def"
 "Back To The Basics"
 "Go For Yours ('Cause I'm Gonna Get Mine)"
 "Born To Be Wild"
 "She's Gone"
 "Juice Crew Law (Boogie Down Productions Diss)"
 "Words Of A Freestyle"
 "They Used To Do It Out In The Park"
 "Never Rock A Party"

References

MC Shan albums
1988 albums
Albums produced by Marley Marl
Cold Chillin' Records albums